The men's sprint at the 1976 Summer Olympics in Montreal, Canada, was held from 21 to 24 July 1976. There were 25 participants from 25 nations. Following the explosion in size of the event from 1960 to 1972 when nations were allowed two cyclists each, the limit was again reduced to one competitor from each nation. The event was won by Anton Tkáč of Czechoslovakia, the nation's first medal in the men's sprint. Tkáč beat two-time defending champion Daniel Morelon of France in the final; Morelon's silver was a (still-standing record fourth medal in the event. Jürgen Geschke earned bronze to give East Germany its first medal in the event and the first medal for any German cyclist since 1952.

Background

This was the 16th appearance of the event, which has been held at every Summer Olympics except in 1904 and 1912. Three quarterfinalists from 1972 returned: two-time gold medalist (and 1964 bronze medalist) Daniel Morelon of France and fifth-place finishers Niels Fredborg of Denmark and Jürgen Geschke of East Germany. Morelon had seven world championships to go with his two Olympic gold medals, and was again the favorite. Anton Tkáč of Czechoslavkia had won the 1974 world championship and was a contender as well.

Antigua and Barbuda and Yugoslavia each made their debut in the men's sprint; East Germany competed separately for the first time. France made its 16th appearance, the only nation to have competed at every appearance of the event.

Competition format

This sprint competition involved a series of head-to-head matches. The 1976 competition featured a smaller field than previous Games, reducing the number of rounds from ten to eight by eliminating the second round and second repechage. The 1976 sprint involved eight rounds: five main rounds (first round, 1/8 finals, quarterfinals, semifinals, and finals) as well as two repechages after the first two main rounds; the second repechage was a two-round repechage.

 First round: The 25 entrants were divided into 12 heats of 2 cyclists each (except the final heat, which had 3). The winner of each heat advanced directly to the 1/8 finals (12 cyclists), while all other cyclists who competed were sent to the first repechage (13 cyclists).
 First repechage: The 13 cyclists were divided into 6 heats, each with 2 cyclists (again, except the final heat, which had 3). The winner of each heat advanced to the 1/8 finals (6 cyclists), while all others were eliminated (7 cyclists).
 1/8 finals: The 18 cyclists who advanced through the first rounds (including repechage) competed in a 1/8 finals round. There were 6 heats in this round, with 3 cyclists in each. The top cyclist in each heat advanced to the quarterfinals (6 cyclists), while the other 2 in each heat went to the second repechage (12 cyclists).
 Second repechage: This was a two-round repechage. The repechage began with 4 heats of 3 cyclists each. The top cyclist in each heat advanced to the second round, while the other 2 cyclists in each heat were eliminated. The second round of this repechage featured 2 heats of 2 cyclists each, with the winners advancing to the quarterfinals and the losers eliminated.
 Quarterfinals: Beginning with the quarterfinals, all matches were one-on-one competitions and were held in best-of-three format. There were 4 quarterfinals, with the winner of each advancing to the semifinals and the loser going to the fifth-eighth classification race.
 Semifinals: The two semifinals provided for advancement to the gold medal final for winners and to the bronze medal final for losers.
 Finals: Both a gold medal final and a bronze medal final were held, as well as (for the first time) a classification final for fifth through eighth places for quarterfinal losers.

Records

The records for the sprint are 200 metre flying time trial records, kept for the qualifying round in later Games as well as for the finish of races.

No new world or Olympic records were set during the competition.

Schedule

All times are Eastern Daylight Time (UTC-4)

Results

First round

First round heat 1

First round heat 2

First round heat 3

First round heat 4

First round heat 5

First round heat 6

First round heat 7

First round heat 8

First round heat 9

First round heat 10

First round heat 11

First round heat 12

First repechage

First repechage heat 1

First repechage heat 2

First repechage heat 3

First repechage heat 4

First repechage heat 5

First repechage heat 6

1/8 finals

1/8 final 1

1/8 final 2

1/8 final 3

1/8 final 4

1/8 final 5

1/8 final 6

Second repechage heats

Second repechage heat 1

Second repechage heat 2

Second repechage heat 3

Second repechage heat 4

Second repechage finals

Second repechage final 1

Second repechage final 2

Quarterfinals

Quarterfinal 1

Quarterfinal 2

Quarterfinal 3

Quarterfinal 4

Semifinals

Semifinal 1

Semifinal 2

Finals

Classification 5–8

Bronze medal match

Final

Final classification

References

External links
 Official Report

S
Cycling at the Summer Olympics – Men's sprint
Track cycling at the 1976 Summer Olympics